Industrial architecture is the design and construction of buildings facilitating the industry. The architecture revolving around the industrial world uses a variety of building designs and styles to be able to occupy labor and distribution of goods. Such buildings rose in importance with the Industrial Revolution, starting in Britain, and were some of the pioneering structures of modern architecture. Many of the architectural buildings revolving around the industry allowed for processing, manufacturing, distribution, and the storage of good and resources. Architects also, have to consider the safety measurements and workflow to ensure the smooth flow within the work environment located in the building.

Occupation: Industrial Architects 
These architects are specialized in designing and the planning of industrial buildings or infrastructure. When it comes to planning they have to ensure quality standards to make sure it is safely built for production or human use. Industrial architects are responsible for the design and planning of the following: markets, warehouses, factories, processing plants, commercial facilities, and much more.

Background

Origins of the Industrial Revolution 
Britain played an important role on the uprising of the Industrial Revolution which altered the way people live and made certain jobs in society a lot easier of humans; went from doing everything by hand to using machinery. The Industrial Revolution stimulated the expansion of trade  and distribution of goods amongst Europe and the Atlantic Ocean. The technological advances from Europe were later spread to the United States in the late 1700s. Samuel Slater fled to the United States and later opened a textile mill in Rhode Island; shortly after that the cotton gin was invented by Eli Whitney.

One of the very first industrial buildings were built in Britain in the 1700s during the First Industrial Revolution, which later inspired other industrial architecture to arise throughout the world. The First Industrial Revolution lasted from mid-1700s to the mid-1800s and then later the Second Industrial Revolution came about which mainly focused on the use of new materials and production of goods.

1700s 
One of the earliest industrial buildings were relativity built at a domestic scale, for instance workshops for local craftsmen.

1700s–1850s 
This time period was the transformation of the British economy. The population in England had increased to 16 million people around 1841, with the majority moving to Northern Europe. Factories have been built and production in the factories had became dominant; production was not on a large-scale.

1850s–1914 
Britain saw a increase in production during this time period. Railways played an important role in transportation and distribution of resources throughout Europe and the United States. Industrial buildings were built at a larger scale to accommodate large machinery used in food production such as flour mills and breweries. With the implementation of the Planning Act of 1909, the industry had a significant impact on the siting and layout of industrial facilities as it continued to progress throughout the years.

1914 to present 
As architecture becomes modernized throughout the years, the more traditional industrial sites throughout Europe and the United States continue to decrease. For instance, coal is a raw material that was heavily used throughout the industrial revolution, so there were coal mines. Buildings continued to increase in size to accommodate mass production. The overall design of modern-day building are more sleek and are more spacious.

Types of Industrial Buildings 

 Brewery
 Distillery
 Drilling rig
 Factory
 Forge
 Foundry
 Gristmill
 Mine
 Power plant
 Refinery
 Sawmill
 Warehouse

References

Further reading 

 Bradley, Betsy Hunter. The Works: The Industrial Architecture of the United States. New York: Oxford University Press, 1999.
 Jefferies, Matthew. Politics and Culture in Wilhelmine Germany: The Case of Industrial Architecture. Washington, D.C.: Berg, 1995.
 Jevremović, Ljiljana; Turnšek, Branko A. J.; Vasić, Milanka; and Jordanović, Marina. "Passive Design Applications: Industrial Architecture Perspective", Facta Universitatis Series: Architecture and Civil Engineering, Vol. 12, No. 2 (2014):  173–82.
 
 McGowan, F.; Radosevic, S.; and Tunzelmann, N. von. Emerging Industrial Architecture in Europe. Hoboken: Taylor and Francis, 2004.
 
 
 

Industrial buildings
Architecture